The 2003 Irish Open was an invitational non-ranking snooker tournament held in Derry, Northern Ireland in February 2003. The tournament was open to players from Northern Ireland and the Republic of Ireland. Joe Swail won the event, defeating Fergal O'Brien 10–3 in the final, earning £5,000 in prize money.

Main draw

References

2003 in snooker
2003 in Northern Ireland sport
Snooker non-ranking competitions
Irish Open